Thirteen Most Wanted Men was a large mural created by Andy Warhol for the New York State Pavilion at the 1964 World's Fair at Flushing Meadows, New York.  The mural was painted over with silver paint before the fair opened, probably due to official objections, but other reasons have been suggested.

Warhol and nine (originally ten) other artists were commissioned in 1962 to create works to decorate  square spaces at the New York State Pavilion.  The nine others were Peter Agostini, John Chamberlain, Robert Indiana, Ellsworth Kelly, Roy Lichtenstein, Alexander Liberman, Robert Mallary, Robert Rauschenberg, James Rosenquist; the eleventh was Claes Oldenburg.

Warhol's large mural was intended to hang on the outside of the Theaterama, a circular cinema  in diameter.  Intending to depict "something to do with New York", and taking inspiration from Marcel Duchamp's 1923 work Wanted, $2,000 Reward (in which Duchamp put his own photograph in a wanted poster), Warhol decided to print large-scale copies of images from a booklet published on 1 February 1962 by the New York Police Department, entitled "The Thirteen Most Wanted", showing 22 head-and-shoulder mug shots of the wanted men.  Silkscreens for the panels of the mural were created in early 1964, printed in silkscreen ink on Masonite panels, and the completed  5-by-5 square of front and side views (including three blank frames) was installed at the site by 15 April.  Warhol stated that the work cost $4,000 to create.

Government officials quickly objected to the images and on 16 April 1962 - two weeks before the fair was due to open - Philip Johnson, the architect of the pavilion, told Warhol that he must remove or replace the work within 24 hours.  The stated reason was that the Governor of New York Nelson Rockefeller was concerned that the images - mostly depicting men of Italian descent - would be insulting to an important segment of his electorate.  Other reasons later reported for the work being painted over included Warhol's dissatisfaction with the work, or with the way it had been hung, or his concern at possible legal liability as one of the men had been pardoned.

Warhol's suggestion that he could replace the mural with 25 portraits of Robert Moses, president of the World's Fair from 1960 until 1966, was not taken up, so on 17 April 1962 he gave his permission for it to be painted over, and it had been obliterated with aluminum house paint before the fair opened to the public. Some critics have seen the monochrome silver  square painted over the mural as a separate artwork, as a form of ironic comment on images of the "most wanted" men not being desired at the World's Fair. It could also be interpreted as a critique to abstract expressionism, as done by the artist constantly throughout his oeuvre, silencing the painting into abstract monochromy. Later commentators have also suggested that the title "wanted" bears a double meaning, referring to homosexual desire, with the mugshots rearranged so many of the men were looking at each other.

Warhol used the same silkscreens to create a series of smaller  diptych paintings on canvas that were exhibited at the Sonnabend Gallery in Paris, and then in Cologne and London, in 1967-68  The work may have partly inspired two compilations made from his Screen Tests series of 16mm films, 13 Most Beautiful Women and 13 Most Beautiful Boys, made in 1964-5.

For the 50th anniversary of the World's Fair, the Queens Museum in New York put on an exhibition of related items from April to September 2014. The exhibition moved to the Andy Warhol Museum in Pittsburgh from September 2014 to January 2015.

References

Further reading

 

 

 

 

 

 

 

1964 paintings
Paintings by Andy Warhol
1964 New York World's Fair
Lost works of art
Censorship in the United States
Most wanted lists